Steven James Douglas Marshall  (born 23 November 1989) is a Canadian male volleyball player. He is a member of the Canada men's national volleyball team and German club Berlin Volleys. Steven was also a participant in the 2016 Summer Olympics, a gold medallist at the NORCECA Men's Volleyball Championship in 2015, and a bronze medallist at the 2015 Pan American Games.

Personal life
Steven was born in Abbotsford, British Columbia to parents Robin and David Marshall. Growing up, Steven was a multi-sport athlete, and at the age of 15 he started playing competitive volleyball.

Career
Steven began his post-secondary volleyball career at Trinity Western University, playing with the Spartans men's volleyball team. He spent four years there, highlighted by winning the CIS national championship in 2012.

Steven first joined the Senior men's national team in 2014, after joining the 'B' team in 2012. He was a member of the squad that finished a national best 7th place at the 2014 FIVB Volleyball Men's World Championship, and helped the team win bronze at both the 2015 NORCECA Championship and Pan American Games.

Steven was a member of the squad that finished 5th at the 2016 Summer Olympics. In June 2021, Marshall was named to Canada's 2020 Olympic team.

Sporting Achievements

Clubs

National Championships
 2009/2010  CIS Men's Volleyball Championship, with Trinity Western Spartans
 2011/2012  CIS Men's Volleyball Championship, with Trinity Western Spartans
 2016/2017  Volleyball Bundesliga, with Berlin Volleys
 2017/2018  Volleyball Bundesliga, with Berlin Volleys

National Team

 2015  Pan American Games
 2015  NORCECA Championship
 2017  FIVB World League

Individually
 2017 Memorial of Hubert Jerzy Wagner – Best Outside Spiker

References

External links
 
 

1989 births
Living people
Canadian men's volleyball players
Place of birth missing (living people)
Volleyball players at the 2015 Pan American Games
Pan American Games bronze medalists for Canada
Volleyball players at the 2016 Summer Olympics
Pan American Games medalists in volleyball
PAOK V.C. players
Olympic volleyball players of Canada
Medalists at the 2015 Pan American Games
Volleyball players at the 2020 Summer Olympics
Outside hitters